Johannes Ingildsen (born 1 July 1997) is a Danish tennis player.

Ingildsen has a career high ATP singles ranking of 1522 achieved on 18 October 2021. He also has a career high ATP doubles ranking of 1077 achieved on 18 October 2021.

Ingildsen represents Denmark at the Davis Cup, where he has a W/L record of 1–1.

ATP Challenger and ITF Futures finals

Doubles 14 (10–4)

References

External links

Johannes Ingildsen at University of Florida

1997 births
Living people
Danish male tennis players
Sportspeople from Copenhagen
Florida Gators men's tennis players
21st-century Danish people